Ramnagar College, established in 1972, is a general degree college in Depal, in Ramnagar II, in Purba Medinipur district. It offers undergraduate courses in arts and sciences. It is affiliated to Vidyasagar University.

Departments

Science

Chemistry
Physics
Mathematics
Botany
Zoology
Physiology
Nutrition
Aquaculture Management and Technology
Industrial Fish and Fisheries (Major)
Fishery and Farm Management (B.Voc.)

Arts and Commerce

Bengali
Elective English
Sanskrit
History
Geography
Political Science
Sociology
Music
Commerce
Physical Education

Accreditation
The college is recognized by the University Grants Commission (UGC).

See also

References

External links
 http://www.ramnagarcollege.com/

Colleges affiliated to Vidyasagar University
Educational institutions established in 1972
Universities and colleges in Purba Medinipur district
1972 establishments in West Bengal